This is a list of ambassadors from Mongolia to Russia and the Soviet Union:

References

External links 
  Embassy of Mongolian in Moscow

 
Russia
Mongolia